Erythrodontia is the red discoloration of teeth. It can be seen in congenital erythropoietic porphyria.

See also 
 List of dental abnormalities associated with cutaneous conditions

References

Developmental tooth pathology